William James Harris (14 May 1877 – 12 July 1957) was an Australian rules footballer who played with St Kilda in the Victorian Football League (VFL).

Early Years

Career 
Bill Harris played for St. Kilda football club in the 1900 season at the age of 23. He played two games with St. Kilda against Collingwood and Essendon.

References

External links 

1877 births
1957 deaths
Australian rules footballers from Melbourne
St Kilda Football Club players
Richmond Football Club (VFA) players
People from Glen Huntly, Victoria